Keith Black (June 25, 1926 – May 13, 1991) was an American producer of high performance drag racing engines, often used in Top Fuel and Tractor pulling applications.

Racing
Black first made a name for himself in the mid-1940s in boat racing. He set a world record in his second time out at Salton Sea. People liked his engines, and he quickly started a business out of his garage.

He opened Keith Black Racing Engines in 1959. By 1961 his boat racing exploits included nearly 50 international and national records. 

Drag racing teams heard about his boat racing engines, and he was convinced by friend Tommy Greer to build a drag racing motor for the Greer-Black-Prudhomme Top Fuel dragster. In 1962 and 1963 the team won over 250 rounds to less than 25 losses. Black spent time in the late 1960s with Roland Leong's Hawaiian Top Fuel dragsters, and in the early 1970s with the Plymouth Barracuda Funny Car campaigned by "Big John" Mazmanian.

Engineer
Chrysler contracted Black to develop a marine racing program in 1965.

Ed Donovan introduced the specialized aluminum engine block for nitro drag racing in 1971; the "Donovan 417" was based on a 1958 Chrysler 392 hemi. Black's aluminum engine blocks would dominate the market by the end of the decade. The engines Keith Black produced were based on the Chrysler 426 Hemi, Chevy Big Block, and Oldsmobile Big Block designs, but cut from virgin aluminum castings and built to the customer's specifications.

Keith Black died from complications due to brain cancer in 1991.

Award
He was inducted in the Motorsports Hall of Fame of America in 1995.

References

External links
Keith Black Racing Engines

1926 births
1991 deaths
Drag racing
People from Huntington Park, California
People from Downey, California
Burials at Rose Hills Memorial Park